Driving Miss Wealthy is a 2004 Hong Kong romantic comedy film  directed by James Yuen and reunites La Brassiere's Lau Ching-wan and Gigi Leung. In the film, Lau poses a chauffeur hired to look after the spoiled rich woman played by Leung.

Plot
Jennifer Fung (Gigi Leung) is a spoiled-rotten daughter of a millionaire. When Jennifer's father realizes that she's spending way too much money, he hires Kit (Sean Lau) to pretend to be a Filipino chauffeur named Mario and chaperone her. Then, Jennifer's father decides that he's going to teach her the value of money and hard-work, so he pretends to be ill, leaving all the money to Pamela, his business partner. Pamela kicks Jennifer out into the street to live with Kit/Mario. The two learn to live together and work hard to get back on top.

Cast

 Sean Lau as Kit / Mario
 Gigi Leung as Jennifer Fung
 Benz Hui as Police officer
 Tats Lau as Dr. Andy Lau
 May Law as Ybonne
 Sophie Wong as Debbie
 Jim Chim as Peter / Aunt Mary / Uncle Big / policeman / faker
 Chow Chung as Tycoon Fung Kwok-lap
 Jamie Luk as Soldier applying for bodyguard job
 William Tuen as G$ applying for bodyguard job
 Gao Yuan as Pamela
 Henry Fong as Director of TV commercialJohnny Lu as Samson
 Poon An-ying as Harassed woman at identity parade
 Johnny Lu as Samson
 Leung Wai-yan as Jennifer's freeloading friend
 JoJo Shum as Jennifer's freeloading friend
 Poon Koon-lam
 Albert Mak as TV commercial crew

External links
 IMDb entry
 Driving Miss Wealthy at hkmdb.com

2004 films
2004 romantic comedy films
Hong Kong romantic comedy films
2000s Cantonese-language films
China Star Entertainment Group films
Films set in Hong Kong
Films shot in Hong Kong
Films with screenplays by James Yuen
Films directed by James Yuen
2000s Hong Kong films